Jeremy Rose is a jazz saxophonist, bass clarinettist, and pianist who is a founding member of the band The Vampires (band). He is also artistic director of record label Earshift Music and an academic at the University of Sydney.

Career
Rose was born and raised in Sydney, New South Wales, Australia. Career highlights include Australian and European/UK tours with artists such as Lionel Loueke, Kurt Rosenwinkel, The Beautiful Girls. Jeremy is founding member of The Strides and The Vampires, Visions of Nar, Vazesh, Compass Quartet, Project Infinity and the Jeremy Rose Quartet. As a composer, he has received a multiple grants from the Australia Council for the Arts, ABC Jazz, Create NSW, APRA AMCOS and Inner West Council.

Rose composed Iron in the Blood: A Musical Adaptation of Robert Hughes' The Fatal Shore, performed by the Earshift Orchestra and featured at the 2020 Sydney Festival. Rose co-composed Disruption! The Voice of Drums with Simon Barker and Chloe Kim, which premiered at the 2021 Sydney Festival. Rose has taught jazz improvisation, saxophone, composition and Music Business Skills at Sydney Conservatorium of Music. In 2009, Rose founded the label Earshift Music, a Sydney-based independent record label for jazz and adventurous music.

Discography

As leader
 Chiba (Earshift Music, 2009)
 Sand Lines (Earshift Music, 2015)
 Within and Without (Earshift Music, 2017)
 Face to Face (Earshift Music, 2022)

With The Earshift Orchestra
 Iron in the Blood (ABC Jazz, 2016)
 Disruption: The Voice of Drums featuring Simon Barker and Chloe Kim (Earshift Music, 2022)

With The Vampires (band)
 Pacifica (Earshift Music, 2019)
 The Vampires Meet Lionel Loueke (Earshift Music, 2017)
 Tiro (Earshift Music, 2013)
 Garfish (Earshift Music, 2012)
 Chellowdene (Earshift Music, 2009)
 South Coasting (Jazzgroove Music, 2008)

With Vazesh
 The Sacred Key (Earshift Music, 2021)

With The Strides
 The Youth, The Rich & The Fake (Earshift Music, 2015)
 Reclamation (Earshift Music, 2011)
 The Strides (Earshift Music, 2009)

With Compass Quartet
 Oneirology featuring Jackson Harrison (Earshift Music, 2013)
 Ode to an Auto Rickshaw featuring Bobby Singh and Sarangan Sriranganathan (Earshift Music, 2011)
 Tango Abrazo with Marcello Maio and Julian Curwin (Tall Poppies, 2013)

As sideman
With Cameron Undy
 Bone (Earshift Music, 2002)

With Steve Barry Quartet
 Blueprints and Vignettes (Earshift Music, 2017)

References

External links 
 Official site 

1984 births
Living people
Australian jazz musicians
Musicians from Sydney